Horace Powell Bannister (4 June 1900 – 7 December 1978) was an Australian rules footballer who played with St Kilda and Richmond in the Victorian Football League (VFL).

Notes

External links 
		

1900 births
1978 deaths
Australian rules footballers from Melbourne
St Kilda Football Club players
Richmond Football Club players
Brighton Football Club players
Australian military personnel of World War I
People from Hawthorn, Victoria
Military personnel from Melbourne